David Kenga (born July 8, 1982) is a Kenyan footballer who currently plays for SC United Bantams in the USL Premier Development League.

Career

College and Amateur
Kenga was born in Kilifi. He moved from his native Kenya to the United States in 2003 to attend and play college soccer at Winthrop University in Rock Hill, South Carolina. In the summer of 2006, he also played for the Indiana Invaders of the fourth division Premier Development League.

Professional
On April 10, 2008, the Charleston Battery of the USL First Division signed Kenga. He made his professional debut on April 12, 2008 as a substitute in Charleston's opening day fixture against Miami FC, and went on to make 17 appearances and score one goal before being released at the end of the year.

Having been unable to sign on with a professional club elsewhere, he returned to the amateur Indiana Invaders in 2009, playing 6 games for the South Bend side in the USL Premier Development League.

Coaching
In addition to his playing career, Kenga worked as an assistant coach at UMass Lowell between 2003 and 2005. He founded with his cousin Robert Mambo the Fuhaha Academy, an Youth Soccer Academy for Boys and Girls.

Personal life
He is one of the founders of Furaha Youth Soccer Academy based in Kenyan coastal town of Kilifi. Kenga is a cousin of the famous Kenian midfielder Robert Mambo Mumba.

References

External links
Winthrop University bio

1982 births
Living people
Kenyan footballers
Kenyan expatriate footballers
Kenya international footballers
Winthrop Eagles men's soccer players
Indiana Invaders players
Charleston Battery players
SC United Bantams players
USL League Two players
USL First Division players
Moi University alumni
Expatriate soccer players in the United States
Association football midfielders